Inwire is the sophomore album by Canadian rock band Sven Gali, released on September 26, 1995 through RCA in America and BMG Canada in Canada. It was recorded at Metalworks Studios in Mississauga, London Bridge Studios in Seattle as well as Robert Lang Studios (also in Seattle).

Recording
The album features guest appearances by Christopher Thorn of Blind Melon on the song Tired of Listening and Who Said?  and both Kevin Martin and Scott Mercado of Candlebox; both on the song Worms as well as Scott Mercado additionally performing on the song Helen.

Reception
While the album was praised by music critics as evidence of the band's maturity into song writing and lyrics, many fans of the first album shunned the move in the group's musical directions; viewing it as an effort to maintain popularity rather than stay true to their real, core sound.

Track listing

References

Sven Gali albums
1995 albums